Batallas is a location in the La Paz Department in Bolivia. It is the seat of the Batallas Municipality, one of the four municipalities of the Los Andes Province.

References 

 Instituto Nacional de Estadistica de Bolivia

Populated places in La Paz Department (Bolivia)